The British Model Flying Association (BMFA) is the body elected by the Royal Aero Club to be responsible for all aspects of flying model aircraft in the UK.

History
The BMFA was founded in 1922 as the SMAE (Society of Model Aeronautical Engineers). The change of name took place in 1987 during the AGM of the SMAE voted to adopt a working title, the British Model Flying Association. The SMAE still exists as the parent Limited Company and its title is still used on any legal documents, however, the title BMFA is used in day to day usage by its members.  Their Head office is currently based in Chacksfield House, Leicester, UK.

Activities
Over 850 clubs in the UK are affiliated with it, with approximately 36,000 members. It has a regular magazine publication called BMFA News.

Area bodies
The whole of the UK is administered from the Head Office, but locally there are 14 "Area" committees which meet periodically, and these meetings are attended by club delegates who can, through various channels open to the "Areas", propose changes or additions to the running of the sport, these are then voted upon at Council meetings held at the Head Office. If passed, the changes will be incorporated in the guidelines produced by the organisation and published in the "BMFA Handbook".

External links
 BMFA Website

Aviation organisations based in the United Kingdom
Model aircraft
Clubs and societies in the United Kingdom
Organisations based in Leicestershire
Organizations established in 1922
Sport in Leicester
1922 establishments in the United Kingdom